Derby Guildhall is a municipal building in the Market Place, Derby, England. It is a Grade II listed building.

History
A moot hall was first established in the Market Place area in 1204. This was replaced by a timber and plaster guildhall in 1500 which, in turn, made way for a stone guildhall which was designed by Richard Jackson in the Classical style and completed in 1730. A turret clock designed by John Whitehurst was installed on the face of the building in the mid-18th century.

The next structure, which was designed by Matthew Habershon also in the Classical style, was built slightly to the south of the previous structures and was completed in 1828. It featured a large portico incorporating a large archway allowing access to the market hall on the ground floor, four Ionic columns on the first floor of the portico and a pediment above that. During the 19th century, a series of tunnels were built to allow prisoners to be escorted from the police station in Lock Up Yard to the assizes taking place in the guildhall.

After the building was badly damaged by a fire, the interior and part of the structure was rebuilt to a design by Henry Duesbury in 1842. The new design saw the removal of the portico and it being replaced with a tower with a new clock, a cupola and a weather vane. Two large stones panels, one representing a court room and the other representing a council chamber, designed by the sculptor John Bell, were added to the face of the building.

Queen Victoria visited the Guildhall on 21 May 1891 and received a formal address from the mayor, Alfred Haslam, before departing for the site of the proposed Derbyshire Royal Infirmary, to lay a foundation stone and to knight the mayor.

The guildhall was the scene of the initial stages of the trial of the anti-war campaigner, Alice Wheeldon, in 1917. She was committed for trial at the Old Bailey in London where she was convicted of conspiracy to murder Prime Minister David Lloyd George and his cabinet colleague Arthur Henderson. A Blue Plaque to commemorate her life was subsequently erected at her home, 12 Pear Tree Road, in Normanton.

The guildhall ceased to function as the local of seat of government when the town council moved to the Council House in 1949, and the vacated guildhall was converted for use as a theatre in 1975. A main feature of theatre's programme has been the annual Christmas pantomime which has been presented by theatre companies such as the "Babbling Vagabonds" since 2000. The viability of such theatre companies was questioned after the theatre closed in January 2019 so that long-term essential building maintenance works could be carried out.

References

Government buildings completed in 1828
City and town halls in Derbyshire
Grade II listed buildings in Derby
Government buildings with domes